Marine Association Football Club are an English football club based in Crosby, Merseyside.

Marine are notable for having the longest serving manager in postwar English football. Roly Howard occupied the post from 1972 to 2005 and oversaw a total of 1,975 games.

History
The club was formed in 1894 by a group of local businessmen and former college students. Marine takes its name from a hotel on the River Mersey sea front at Waterloo, seven miles to the north of Liverpool city centre, where the founders of the club met. Marine moved to its present ground, Rossett Park, in 1903.

Marine quickly won multiple titles in the I Zingari League and the Liverpool Combination. The club's greatest success as an amateur team in this period culminated in an FA Amateur Cup Final appearance in 1931–32, where they lost 7–1 to Dulwich Hamlet in front of a crowd of 22,000 fans at the Boleyn Ground.

In 1935–36 the club moved to the all-professional Lancashire Combination and enjoyed limited success before moving to the Cheshire County League in 1969–70.

In 1972, Roly Howard was appointed first team manager. Over a 33-year period he completed 1,975 competitive games, before retiring at the end of the 2004–05 season. He was recognised by the Guinness Book of Records as the longest serving manager in world football as Marine enjoyed their most successful period, winning 30 trophies.

The club relinquished its amateur status and became professional in 1974. Following this, three Cheshire League Championships were won in five seasons before Marine progressed to the Northern Premier League in 1979–80. They were Champions twice in the 1993–94 and 1994–95 seasons as well as finishing as runners-up on two occasions. Marine have also won the League Challenge Cup on four occasions in 1984–85, 1991–92, 2002–03 and 2015–16.

In 1999, the magazine FourFourTwo included a monthly feature on the club, sending Michael Hann to follow them for an entire season.

In 2001, Marine were the subject of a six-part television series for Granada TV, titled Marine Lives. The series included footage of former player Jason McAteer returning to visit the club.

 Under the new management team of Alvin McDonald and assistant Peter Carroll, Marine qualified for the Northern Premier Division play-offs twice in succession (2005–06 and 2006–07), losing to the eventual winners each time. In the 2007–08 season, the club finished seventh and won the Liverpool Senior Cup. McDonald left the club partway through the 2008–09 season following a poor run of form, with players Kevin Lynch and Phil Brazier being appointed caretakers. At the end of the season, Lynch was appointed permanent manager with Brazier as his assistant.

Lynch departed the club at the end of the 2012–13 season to become first team coach at Chesterfield, and was replaced by Brazier. However, Brazier was sacked at the end of the following season with the club having narrowly avoided relegation.

Former Vauxhall Motors boss Carl Macauley took over at the beginning of the 2014–15 season, but a poor run of form saw the club in the relegation zone, 11 points from safety, and he was sacked. Defender Sean Hessey was placed in temporary charge until the end of the season, and guided the club to a remarkable escape from relegation, with only one defeat in their final twelve games. The club were reprieved from relegation despite finishing in 21st place, due to having the highest average points per game of clubs in the highest relegation spots across the three equivalent divisions. This meant that the club continued to hold their record as the longest-serving members of the Northern Premier League.

Hessey was confirmed as the club's permanent manager prior to the end of the 2014–15 season.

In the 2015–16 season, Marine had a less turbulent ending to the league campaign culminating in a 15th-place finish. Trusting in many of the players that ensured the club's survival in the previous season, the club started the campaign well. However, with the weather leading to many postponements, the winter saw not only a disjointed fixture list, but also a run of poor performances. Marine gained more stability in the latter stages of the season and this in particular led to a strong performance in the league cup, beating Glossop North End, Ramsbottom United and Workington to progress to the quarter-finals. A home draw saw Ossett Town narrowly beaten 1–0 before Colwyn Bay were drawn to visit Rossett Park in the semi finals.

Under new management and with relegation all but sealed, Colwyn Bay struggled in the game and were defeated 4–1 with Alan Burton, Andy Owens, James Foley and player-manager Sean Hessey getting on the score-sheet. This set up a final against Scarborough Athletic to be held at Throstle Nest, home of Farsley Celtic. Marine struggled in the match with Hessey dropping himself to the bench in place of defender Liam Willis who became captain in place of the unavailable Andy Nicholas. Going 0–1 down in the 58th minute, it wasn't until the player-manager subbed himself on for Willis in the 80th minute that Marine looked dangerous. The defender taking a free-kick which was headed in by Warren Bellew in the 87th minute. At 1–1, the game looking destined for penalties, was turned on its head in the fourth minute of added time as that season's highest club goalscorer Danny Mitchley curled in an effort from the edge of the box to win the game for Marine. This was the fourth time that Marine FC have won the league cup, a record for this competition.

Towards the end of a dismal 2016–17 season. Hessey left the club and was replaced by Tommy Lawson. A mass walk-out of players didn't help Lawson but he managed to assemble a squad at short notice. He then guided the club away from the relegation zone after 5 wins in 11 games. Marine finished in 18th place in the table.

The 2017–18 season was once again a disappointment with Marine unable to improve on the previous campaign and ended up finishing in 19th place in the table. Very poor home form once again saw the Mariners win only 6 of their 23 league games at Rossett Park. However the team did do well in the cups reaching the final of the Liverpool Senior Cup. Home advantage at Marine didn't help and 750 fans saw them well and truly beaten 4–0 by Prescot Cables. They also went on a decent run in the FA Trophy beating Whitby Town and Atherton Collieries. They then saw off teams from the division above in FC United and Chorley before a first ever visit to Dover Athletic saw them lose 3–4 against the Conference National team.

The 2018–19 season saw manager Tommy Lawson introduce a raft of new signings to the squad whilst other players left for pastures new. However, with only five games of the season played Marine found themselves second from bottom of the league. A 2–0 defeat at home to Grantham Town on 1 September proved to be a turning point with manager Tommy Lawson resigning the following day. His assistant Ian Johnson was given temporary charge of team affairs whilst the club looked for a replacement.

On 13 September 2018, Marine announced the appointment of former Chester manager Neil Young. He was joined by Alan Morgan who was appointed assistant manager on 21 September 2018. Young started his tenure with a 1–0 defeat at Warrington Town on 15 September 2018.

In 2019, Marine were relegated (for the first time in their history) to the Northern Premier League Division One North West. It was the first relegation in their history, and followed 40 consecutive seasons at the highest level of the Northern Premier League.

In 2021, Marine reached the third round of the FA Cup, which they lost 5–0 to Tottenham Hotspur. With Marine 161 places below Tottenham, the gap between the two teams was the biggest in FA Cup history.  The match raised over £300,000 for the club from the selling of 32,202 "virtual tickets" to fans of Tottenham and other clubs who wished to support Marine but were unable to attend the match due to the COVID-19 pandemic.

After the FA Cup run in the 2020/21 season, Marine opened a pub with the prize money called 1894 Bar and Bistro.

Marine finished 5th in the 2021/22 season.  They played Workington in the playoff semi final which they won 3-2 after extra time and a Neil Kengni hat trick.  They then won the playoffs after coming from behind to beat Runcorn Linnets which got them promoted to the Northern Premier League Premier Division.

FA Cup

The club have twice reached the third round of the FA Cup.

In 1992–93 they lost 3–1 to Crewe Alexandra, and in 2020–21 they lost 5–0 to Tottenham Hotspur.

Marine have beaten three Football League clubs (Barnsley, Halifax Town and Colchester United) in the competition.

FA Trophy

Marine have twice reached the semi-finals of the FA Trophy, in 1983–84 and 1991–92. Both times, they played a team from the Northwich area. On both occasions they drew away, 1–1 and 2–2 respectively, before losing at home.

In 1983–84 they lost 1–3 on aggregate to Northwich Victoria.

In 1991–92 they lost 3–6 on aggregate to Witton Albion.

Northern Premier League Cup

Marine have appeared in six finals, winning the cup a record four times.

Runners Up 1980–81, 3–4 vs Runcorn

Winners 1984–85 3–2, vs Goole Town

Runners Up 1985–86, 0–1 Hyde United

Winners 1991–92, 1–0 Frickley Athletic

Winners 2002–03, 3–0 (on aggregate) vs Gateshead

Winners 2015–16, 2–1 vs Scarborough Athletic

Marine have also been winners of 13 senior county cups.

Stadium
The club play at Rossett Park, located on College Road in Crosby. It is believed that the ground has been in use since at least 1884 when rugby union was played there. Marine have played at the ground since 1903, when they moved from their previous ground at Waterloo Park, Crosby. The ground's current capacity is 2,150, of which 389 are seated. In 1949, Marine played host to Nigeria at Rossett Park; the crowd was officially given as 4,000 with some considering it to be 6,000.

Between 2006 and 2015, the ground was known as the Arriva Stadium due to a sponsorship deal.

On 24 January 2011, the club announced plans to develop the Arriva Stadium. The outdated floodlights were replaced in the summer of 2012 with a new eco friendly four corner system. The 20m high masts have a total of 28 lamps and these generate in excess of 350 lux, which was the Football League lighting requirement at the time of installation. Further to these plans, the club planned to build a 130-seat covered stand at the Crosender Road end of the ground. The total cost of all the improvements was estimated at £150,000.

On 25 January 2014, the club announced a two-year ground share agreement with North West Counties Premier Division side A.F.C. Liverpool. This has now extended to the 2021–22 season.

In August 2015, Rossett Park was renamed the Marine Travel Arena as a result of a sponsorship deal with the club's existing shirt sponsors, Marine Travel. The deal will continue until 2024.

On 3 May 2022, the club began to dig up the pitch to install a new 4G pitch, after delaying it from the previous summer. This again was funded with the income from the FA Cup run in the 20–21 season. This project was finalised on 12 July.

Colours and badge
Marine's traditional home colours are white shirts with black trim, worn with black shorts and socks.

The club badge is a black and white coat of arms similar to that of the town they are based in, Crosby

Supporters
The club had a supporters association known as the MSA (Marine Supporters Association) that was formed in the late 1980s. The supporters association raises funds for the club, arranges away coach travel to many games, and operates the club's merchandise shop. The MSA was disbanded in November 2021.

The Crosender Way is an independent supporters group for Marine, named after the Crosender Road area of the stadium. Formed in January 2017, the group actively promotes the football club via social media. The group's main objective is to attract and support fans at the club and to organise away travel for all supporters.

Current squad

Backroom staff

Shirt sponsors and manufacturers

Committee, directors and club officials
President – David Thompson
Patron – Sir Kenny Dalglish
Chairman – Paul Leary
Vice Chairman – Dave McMillan
Club Secretary – Richard Cross
Hon. Treasurers – Maurice Broderick, Mark Prescott
Management Committee – Beckie Eustace, Paul Eustace, Giles Horton, Brian Lawlor, James Leary, Peter McCormack, Ralph Rands
Head of Media – Ralph Rands
Media Team – Tom Clarke, David Williams, Daniel Clarke
Programme editor / PA Announcer– Ralph Rands
Welfare Officer – Jude Moizer
Safety Officer – Peter McCormack
Senior Steward – Rob Wells
Clubrooms Manager – John Barry
Assistant Clubrooms Manager – Sandra Bibby
Programme Covers – Neil McAdam
Programme Pitch Squares / Community officer – Barry Lenton
Club photographer – Susan Nugent
Club Shop Manager – Jo Cross
Club Historian – David Wotherspoon
Boardroom Host – Margaret Leary

Honours

FA Amateur Cup
Runners-up: 1931–32
I Zingari League
First Division champions: 1902–03, 1903–04, 1909–10, 1919–20, 1920–21, 1922–23
Second Division champions: 1901–02
League Cup winners: 1919–20, 1920–21, 1922–23
Combination Cup winners: 1919–20, 1920–21, 1921–22
Liverpool Amateur Cup
Winners: 1909–10, 1919–20, 1922–23, 1926–27, 1927–28, 1928–29, 1930–31, 1952–53, 1970–71
Liverpool County Combination
First Division champions: 1927–28, 1930–31, 1933–34, 1934–35, 1943–44
Liverpool County Medal Competition
Winners: 1920–21
Liverpool Challenge Cup
Winners: 1942–43, 1944–45, 1971–72
Lancashire Amateur Cup
Winners: 1921–22, 1925–26, 1930–31, 1931–32, 1932–33, 1933–34
George Mahon Cup
Winners: 1930–31, 1943–44, 1944–45
Lancashire Combination
Cup winners: 1946–47
League Cup winners: 1963–64, 1968–69
Liverpool Senior Non-league Cup
Winners: 1968–69, 1975–76, 1976–77
Cheshire County League
Champions: 1973–74, 1975–76, 1977–78
League Shield winners: 1974–75, 1975–76
Lancashire Junior Cup / Lancashire FA Challenge Trophy
Winners: 1978–79, 1987–88, 1990–91, 1999–2000
Liverpool Senior Cup
Winners: 1978–79, 1984–85, 1987–88, 1989–90, 1993–94, 1999–2000, 2007–08
Northern Premier League
Premier Division champions: 1993–94, 1994–95
Northern Premier League Challenge Shield winners: 1994–95, 1995–96
Challenge Cup winners: 1984–85, 1991–92, 2003–04 and 2015-16.

References

External links
Club website
The Crosender Way (Independent Marine FC Supporters Website)

 
Football clubs in England
Football clubs in Merseyside
Football clubs in Liverpool
Northern Premier League clubs
Sport in the Metropolitan Borough of Sefton
Association football clubs established in 1894
1894 establishments in England
Crosby, Merseyside
I Zingari League
Liverpool County Football Combination
Lancashire Combination
Cheshire County League clubs